The 1879 Longford by-election was held on 5 April 1879.  The byelection was held due to the resignation (Assistant Commissioner of Intermediate Education in Ireland) of the incumbent Home Rule MP, Myles William O'Reilly.  It was won by Justin McCarthy, a member of the Home Rule party. He was unopposed.

References

By-elections to the Parliament of the United Kingdom in County Longford constituencies
1879 elections in the United Kingdom
Unopposed by-elections to the Parliament of the United Kingdom (need citation)
1879 elections in Ireland